Troy Johnson (born 1 October 1997) is a New Zealand cricketer. He made his Twenty20 debut for Wellington in the 2018–19 Super Smash on 12 January 2019. He made his first-class debut on 22 February 2020, for Wellington in the 2019–20 Plunket Shield season.

In June 2020, he was offered a contract by Wellington ahead of the 2020–21 domestic cricket season. He made his List A debut on 29 November 2020, for Wellington in the 2020–21 Ford Trophy. On 15 December 2020, in the 2020–21 Ford Trophy, Johnson scored his first century in a List A match, with 113 runs. In March 2021, in the 2020–21 Plunket Shield season, Johnson scored his maiden century in first-class cricket, with 114 runs.

References

External links
 

1997 births
Living people
New Zealand cricketers
Wellington cricketers
Cricketers from Lower Hutt